Praemordella martynovi is a species of beetle in the family Mordellidae, the only species in the genus Praemordella.

References

Mordellidae
Beetles described in 1929